A Jamaican patty is a semicircular pastry that contains various fillings and spices baked inside a flaky shell, often tinted golden yellow with an egg yolk mixture or turmeric. It is made like a turnover as it is formed by folding over the circular dough cutout over the chosen filling, but is more savoury and filled with ground meat.

As its name suggests, it is commonly found in Jamaica, and is also eaten in other areas of the Caribbean, such as the Caribbean coast of Nicaragua, Panama and Costa Rica. It is traditionally filled with seasoned ground beef, but fillings can include chicken, pork, lamb, vegetables, shrimp, lobster, fish, soy, ackee, mixed vegetables or cheese. In non-Jamaican-based restaurants, to appeal to certain audiences, the patty's composition may be extended to include low-fat, whole wheat crusts. In Jamaica, the patty is often eaten as a full meal, especially when paired with coco bread. It can also be made as bite-sized portions called cocktail patties. Among the Jamaican diaspora in the United Kingdom, the pastry is more like that of a suet crust, and often made with margarine or butter, which provides the flaky pastry, and curry powder containing turmeric, which provides the yellow colour.

History

The beef patty is a product of the long history of Jamaica, mixing pasties introduced by Cornish immigrants and cumin, curry and cayenne pepper introduced by Indian indentured labourers and African slaves who were brought to the country. "The firecracker taste of the Scotch bonnet, a hot pepper indigenous to Jamaica, sealed the flavour."

Jamaicans brought recipes for the patties northward in the 1960s and 1970s when many immigrated to the United States as hospital orderlies, home health aides and nurses. The patties were then found in restaurants in areas of the New York metropolitan area with high West Indian populations. The patties are equally popular in British cities with large West Indian populations, such as Birmingham, Manchester and London. Their popularity is spreading in the United Kingdom and they are becoming available in many mainstream outlets. They are also popular in Toronto, Montreal, Miami, Washington, D.C., and numerous other areas throughout the American northeast and Canadian Great Lakes regions; in many of those areas, they are available in grocery stores, delis, corner stores, and convenience stores. In recent years, the Jamaican meat patty has been pre-made and frozen for mass selling in Britain, Canada, and the United States. In many areas in the United States and Canada, Jamaican beef patties are now typically available at pizza and convenience food restaurants, as well as supermarkets.

Litigation in Canada
In February 1985, after discovering the presence of patty vendors in Toronto, especially from Kensington Patty Palace owned by the Davidson family, the Canadian government attempted to ban the name "beef patty" as it did not comply with the Meat Inspection Act's definition of the word "patty." According to the federal government, the patties the Davidsons sold do not qualify with the Meat Inspection Act's technical definition of a patty which, as NOW Magazine'''s Ramona Leitao stated, described as "meat and seasoning that typically went in a hamburger and couldn’t be enclosed in dough." That month, the government demanded that eight patty vendors, including Kensington Patty Palace which was managed at that time by Michael Davidson, rename the beef patty to a name that distinguishes itself with the patty used for hamburgers or face a CA$ 5,000 fine. This caused the patty vendors to resist giving in to demands and refuse to rename the beef patties. The public were in outrage, and the controversy was featured in Canadian media and, later on, in Jamaican media. On February 19, 1985, officials from the Consumer and Corporate Affairs and representatives from the patty vendors met; it ended with a compromise to identify such as "Jamaican patty." After the so-called "patty summit," Davidson and Kensington Patty Palace held a celebration in store to culminate the so-called "patty wars" on February 23, 1985.

In a Toronto Star column on February 22, 2012, columnist Royson James unofficially declared February 23 as the Jamaican Patty Day in Toronto. The "patty wars" controversy was the subject of a 2022 CBC documentary entitled Patty vs. Patty'', featuring an interview with Michael Davidson, directed by Chris Strikes, and streamed on CBC Gem. The video is now also available on YouTube.

Contemporary usage and commercialization 
Over recent decades the popularity of the Jamaican patty has grown significantly, becoming a mainstream food item in some countries. From being a hand-made pastry in Jamaica's homes and bakeries, it has become commercialised and commoditized, especially in North America. The patties are now often made in large numbers by industrial machinery and sold under brand names in supermarkets and in chain restaurants. In the United States, patties are offered by some restaurants such as pizzerias and included in public school lunches. The New York school system distributed more than three million patties in one year.

See also
 Chicken patty
 Empanada
 Jamaican cuisine
 List of Jamaican dishes

References

Jamaican cuisine
Panamanian cuisine
Costa Rican cuisine
Nicaraguan cuisine
Savoury pies
Stuffed dishes
National dishes